Arvind Maihar Kumar Chaudhary is an Indian politician, belonging to Samajwadi Party. In the 2009 election he was elected to the Lok Sabha from  Basti in Uttar Pradesh.

Political career
Arvind Kumar Chaudhary has been a Member of Parliament in 15th Lok Sabha. In General Election 2009, he has represented the Basti constituency and is a member of the Bahujan Samaj Party. He defeated Samajwadi Party candidate Raj Kishor Singh by record margin of 1,05,210 votes.

Posts held

References

External links
  Official biographical sketch in Parliament of India website

Year of birth missing (living people)
Living people
India MPs 2009–2014
Lok Sabha members from Uttar Pradesh
People from Basti district
Bahujan Samaj Party politicians from Uttar Pradesh